René Schnitzler (born 14 April 1985) is a German former professional footballer who played as a forward.

Career 
Schnitzler was born in Mönchengladbach. He made his debut on the professional league level in the Bundesliga for Borussia Mönchengladbach on 19 May 2007 when he came on as a substitute in the 57th minute in a game against VfL Bochum.

In 2009, after just one day with Sint-Truiden, he returned to Germany and signed for FC Wegberg-Beeck on a two-year contract. He left the club in December 2010.

In 2011 Schnitzler admitted receiving €100,000 to fix five matches while playing for St. Pauli in 2008. On 19 July 2011, he was banned for 30 months in Germany for his part in fixing five second division matches in 2008.

References

1985 births
Living people
Sportspeople from Mönchengladbach
German footballers
Footballers from North Rhine-Westphalia
Association football forwards
Bundesliga players
2. Bundesliga players
Borussia Mönchengladbach players
Borussia Mönchengladbach II players
Bayer 04 Leverkusen II players
FC St. Pauli players
FC St. Pauli II players
FC Wegberg-Beeck players